Henry Gassaway Davis House, also known as the Knights of Pythias Lafayette Lodge Number 3 and Calanthe Temple #8 Pythian Sisters, is a historic home located at Piedmont, Mineral County, West Virginia.  It was built in 1871, for U.S. Senator and vice presidential nominee Henry G. Davis (1823–1916). It is a three-bay, four-story Second Empire style brick duplex. It has a simple mansard roof and 12 gabled pedimented dormer windows on the concave slopes. The front façade features dual stone-and-slate stairs, ascending to two centered paired six-by-nine-foot framed one-story entry porches.

It was listed on the National Register of Historic Places in 2008.

References

Houses in Mineral County, West Virginia
Clubhouses on the National Register of Historic Places in West Virginia
Davis and Elkins family
Houses completed in 1871
Houses on the National Register of Historic Places in West Virginia
Clubhouses in West Virginia
Knights of Pythias buildings
National Register of Historic Places in Mineral County, West Virginia
Second Empire architecture in West Virginia